Eyre may refer to:

Name
Eyre (given name)
Eyre (surname)

Places

Australia

National
Eyre Highway, a highway connecting South Australia and Western Australia

South Australia
Eyre Peninsula (disambiguation)
Eyre, South Australia, a suburb
Lake Eyre (disambiguation)

Western Australia
Electoral district of Eyre
Esperance Plains, biogeographic region of Australia also known as Eyre Botanical District
Eyre Bird Observatory
Eyre Telegraph Station

Elsewhere
Eyre, Raasay, a location in Highland, Scotland
Eyre, Saskatchewan, Canada
Eyre, Isle of Skye, Highland, Scotland
Eyre Creek (disambiguation)
Eyre Hall, home of the Eyre family in Virginia
Eyre River (disambiguation)
Eyre Square, Galway, Ireland
Leyre (river), France

Other uses
Eyre (legal term), in medieval England
Jane Eyre (disambiguation)

See also
Eyre legend, about the Eyre/Ayre family
Eyre Methuen, a publishing company
Éire, island of Ireland
Ayre